Sibone is a ceremonial headdress worn by Burmese women. In the pre-colonial era, the sibone was worn exclusively as royal attire by high-ranking females at the Burmese court, including the queens and princesses. The sibone, along with the mahālatā, formed the ceremonial dress for Burmese state functions. In modern-day Myanmar, the sibone is worn by girls during the ear piercing ceremony, and by Burmese dancers.

See also

Burmese clothing

Burmese headgear